Fereidoun Ali-Mazandarani is an Iranian retired fighter pilot and a Grumman F-14 Tomcat flying ace during the Iran–Iraq War.

Career 
Mazandarani claims 16 aerial victories against Iraqi aircraft during the 1980s, including eight and one using AIM-54 and MIM-23 missiles respectively, two with the Vulcan M61A gun, as well as five manoeuvre kills. French military historian Pierre Razoux has credited him with 9 or 11 confirmed kills.

According to Austrian aviation historian Tom Cooper, Mazandarani and his co-pilot Qassem Soltani may be the first pilots to have ever shoot an aircraft down using AIM-54 Phoenix missile, with a claimed victory against a MiG-23 on 17 September 1980 despite the fact the Iranian air force does not officially acknowledge this victory.

See also 

 List of Iranian flying aces

References 

Iran–Iraq War flying aces
Iranian flying aces
Living people
Islamic Republic of Iran Army colonels
Year of birth missing (living people)